Home is the eighth studio album by British pop and soul band Simply Red, released in 2003. It is the first Simply Red album released on band frontman Mick Hucknall's own record label, Simplyred.com. The album was a success all around the world, and includes the hit singles, "Sunrise", "Fake", "You Make Me Feel Brand New" and "Home".

The album includes three cover versions: the Bob Dylan song, "Positively 4th Street", The Stylistics' soul hit, "You Make Me Feel Brand New", and the Dennis Brown song, "Money in My Pocket". "Sunrise" borrows a loop from the 1981 Hall & Oates song "I Can't Go for That (No Can Do)", as well as some of the lyrics.

Track listing

Limited edition DVD
 "You Make Me Feel Brand New" (live DVD footage)
 "Lost Weekend" (live DVD footage)
 Documentary (DVD footage)
 "Fake" (single mix)
 "Sunrise (Who Knows About Forever)"

2014 Expanded Edition
Disc one – Radio Edits
 "Sunrise (Motivo Hi-Lectro Radio Edit/Mix)" – 3:26
 "Fake (Radio Mix)" – 3:43
 "You Make Me Feel Brand New (Single Edit)" – 4:18
 "Home (Tin Tin Out Radio Mix)" – 3:34
 "Fake (Phunk Investigation Radio Edit)" – 3:01
 "You Make Me Feel Brand New (Antillas Full Vocal Edit)" – 4:14
 "Home (Motivo Hi-lectro Radio Mix)" – 3:23

Disc two – Remixes
 "Sunrise (ATFC Morning Glory Remix)" – 8:29
 "Fake (Phunk Investigation Exte-Club Mix)" – 7:03
 "Home (David Harness Taboo Vocal)" – 8:00
 "Sunrise (Love to Infinity Classic Mix)" – 6:49
 "Fake (Love to Infinity Classic Radio Mix)" – 4:34
 "You Make Me Feel Brand New (Love to Infinity Radio Mix)" – 4:46
 "Fake (Eric Kupper Club Mix)" – 6:51
 "Sunrise (Love to Infinity Club Mix)" – 7:51
 "Fake (Love to Infinity Club Mix)" – 6:58
 "You Make Me Feel Brand New (Love to Infinity Master Mix)" – 6:04
 "Home (Minimal Chic Mix)" – 6:47
 "Sunrise (Who Knows About Forever?)" – 3:15

Disc three – Live at Ronnie Scott's (Recorded February 2003)
 "Fake" – 3:52
 "You Make Me Feel Brand New" – 4:57
 "Positively 4th Street" – 4:27
 "Home Loan Blues" – 4:51
 "Home" – 3:30
 "So Beautiful" – 4:57
 "It's Only Love" – 4:29
 "Come to My Aid" – 4:06
 "Sunrise" – 3:23
 "Lost Weekend" – 3:59
 "Money in My Pocket" – 3:33
 "Something for You" – 6:23
 "Home (Live in Sicily)" (bonus track) – 3:46

DVD
Feature interview
 "Mark Goodier Interviews Mick Hucknall About "Home" – March 2014"
Promo videos
 "Sunrise"
 "Fake"
 "You Make Me Feel Brand New (Live)"
 "Home"
Bonus features
 "Home Album EPK"
 "The Making of Sunrise"
 "The Making of Fake"
BBC TV appearances
 "Sunrise" (Parkinson, broadcast on 22 February 2003)
 "Fake" (Later... with Jools Holland, broadcast on 20 June 2003)

Notes
"Sunrise" contains extracts from "I Can't Go for That (No Can Do)", written by Daryl Hall, John Oates, and Sarah Allen.
 signifies an additional producer
 signifies an original producer

Musicians 
The album credits list the musicians who played on the record, with no indication of which musicians played on which tracks, or what instruments they played.

Credited musicians are (in order listed): Andy Wright, Anthea Clarke, Arthur Adams, Bernie Worrell, Chris De Margary, Danny Saxon, Dave Clayton, Dean Parks, Dee Johnson, Freddie Washington, Gota Yashiki, Ian Kirkham, James Gadson, Joe Sample, John Johnson, Karl Van Den Bossche, Kenji Suzuki, Kevin Robinson, Larry Williams, Lenny Castro, The London Session Orchestra, Mark Jaimes, Mick Hucknall, Miles Bould, Paul "Harry" Harris, Pete Lewinson, Sarah Brown and Steve Lewinson.

Production 
Technical
 Michael Zimmerling – recording engineer (1, 2, 5-8, 11)
 Rik Pekkonen – recording engineer  (4, 9)
 Andy Scade – recording assistant (1, 2, 5-8, 11)
 Johnny Wow – mixing (1, 4-7, 10)
 Steve Fitzmaurice – mixing (2)
 Andy Wright – mixing (3, 8)
 Madkap – mixing (3)
 Mark Jolley – mixing (3)
 John Lee – assistant mix engineer  (1, 2, 4-7, 9, 10)

Album credits
 Peacock Design – art direction, design 
 Rick Guest – photography 
 Andy Earl – band photography 
 Hugh Turvey – photography (pages 5 & 6)
 Gusto – photography (pages 5 & 6)
 So What Media & Management, Inc. and Silent Way, Ltd. – management

Charts

Weekly charts

Year-end charts

Certifications

!scope="row"|Worldwide
|
|2,500,000
|-

References

2003 albums
Self-released albums
Simply Red albums
Albums produced by Stewart Levine